Paw Paws (also known as Paw Paw Bears) is an American animated television series produced by Hanna-Barbera Productions that first aired in 1985 and 1986. It debuted as part of the weekday/weekend morning programming block The Funtastic World of Hanna-Barbera.

The series name is a play on the paw paw, a fruit cultivated by Native Americans and indigenous to North America, and a play on words with a bear's paw. Reruns of the show formerly aired on Cartoon Network and later Boomerang.

Plot
A group of Native American bear cubs defending themselves from their enemies, The Meanos, led by the evil sorcerer Dark Paw. Dark Paw and his henchmen were after the Paw Paws' three large wooden totems, Totem Bear, Totem Tortoise, and Totem Eagle. The totems also served as the tribe's protectors, coming to life when needed through means of Princess Paw Paw's Mystic Moonstone, which she wore around her neck, to defend the village.

Much like other Hanna-Barbera programs, such as The Smurfs, The Biskitts, Shirt Tales, Snorks and the Pound Puppies, the bears had names that denoted their personalities—Laughing Paw, Medicine Paw, Bumble Paw, etc. Brave Paw and Princess Paw Paw tended to be the leads, riding into adventures on their magical flying ponies, while aging Wise Paw served as tribal advisor. The mascot of the group was a tiny dog by the name of PaPooch.

Characters

Paw Paws
 Wise Paw (voiced by John Ingle) – He is the chief leader of the Paw Paws. He is the oldest and wisest of the tribe.
 Princess Paw Paw (voiced by Susan Blu) – She is Wise Paw's daughter. Princess Paw Paw is beautiful and cares for everyone and the village. She carries around the Mystic Moonstone which has the power to bring Totem Bear, Tortoise and Eagle to life. When she blows on her whistle, she can summon her flying horse Flying Cloud. Paw Paws introduced the cartoon world to Susan Blu, who went to do the original voice of Arcee in Hasbro's cartoon series The Transformers as well as many other animated characters.
 Flying Cloud - Princess Paw Paw's flying horse. She is beautiful just like the Princess Paw. Later on the series, she fell in love with the Black Stallion and they started a family have two baby flying horses.
 Brave Paw (voiced by Thom Pinto) – Brave Paw is the Princess's closest friend and presumably her boyfriend. He is courageous and willing to rescue his fellow Paw Paws from danger and fight the forces of evil. Aside from the Princess, he is the only other Paw Paw who rides a flying horse.
 Golden Thunder - Golden Thunder is Brave Paw's flying horse. He can summon Golden Thunder from Thunder Mountain simply by calling his name.
 Mighty Paw (voiced by Robert Ridgely) – He is the biggest and strongest of the Paw Paws, although a bit slow.
 Laughing Paw (voiced by Alexandra Stoddart) – She is younger than the Princess and is known for her sense of humor.
 PaPooch (voiced by Don Messick) – Laughing Paw's pet puppy. He is loyal and brave, but always gets into trouble. A play on the Narragansett term papoose.
 Trembly Paw (voiced by Howard Morris) – He is the coward of the tribe and would rather run from danger, although occasionally he would do heroic deeds.
 Medicine Paw (voiced by Jerry Dexter impersonating W.C. Fields) – He is the shaman of the tribe, but he is a bit of a quack. He appeared in only a few episodes.
 Totem Animals – They are the main protectors of the village. The Totem Animals can be awakened by the Mystic Moonstone wielded by Princess Paw Paw to fight off the Meanos.
 Totem Eagle - The top Totem Animal. He serves as the air transportation.
 Totem Bear (Frank Welker) - The middle Totem Animals. He is usually the one who attacks first after Totem Eagle flies off his head and would often send the Meanos flying.
 Totem Tortoise - The bottom Totem Animal. Totem Tortoise's main function is water transportation.

Villains
 Meanos - The Meanos are the main antagonists of the series. They often attack the Paw Paws until they are defeated by them and the Totem Animals.
 Dark Paw (voiced by Stanley Ralph Ross) – Chief of the Meanos. He carries around a magic staff which he typically uses to zap his enemies...and, when they get on Dark Paw's bad side, his own cohorts. Dark Paw is not as bright as he thinks he is. His personality echoes that of Moe Howard from The Three Stooges.
 Slippery Paw – He is better known for his greasy long hair than for his intelligence. But he's still smarter than Bumble Paw.
 Bumble Paw (voiced by Frank Welker) – He is the shortest and dumbest of the group.
 Aunt Pruney (voiced by Ruth Buzzi) – Aunt Pruney is Dark Paw's aunt, but she is also a witch who rides a vacuum cleaner instead of a broom. She complains to her nephew that he never calls or writes. Aunt Pruney is often disappointed at his constant failures and even helps him out. Aunt Pruney and Wise Paw knew each other personally.
 The Greedy Greenies – They are green slimy monsters seen in a few episodes. They are mostly featureless, except for a pair of eyes, and have voracious appetites. They ate most of the PawPaw village including houses, poles, laundry, and food, with a mixture of sucking and enveloping (similar to phagocytosis, but on a much larger scale) They prefer to come at night, and only make gurgling noises. They can burrow through the ground at will, and sometimes leave behind "puddles" that are actually tunnels, that others (such as Dark Paw and PaPooch) have fallen into, but these can be closed at will. They live in a hidden underground complex near the Paw Paw village, and are led by the Great Greenie. Intruders are lowered into a pool of goo that will cover the victim and eventually assimilate it, turning him or her into another Greenie. Even Dark Paw is afraid of them.
 Great Greenie - The leader of the Greedy Greenies.

Other characters
 Eugene the Genie (voiced by Scatman Crothers) – Eugene is a genie who is a friend of the Paw Paws. He has magic powers and a sassy attitude, especially towards Dark Paw. He appeared in a few episodes.
 Nice Paw – Nice Paw is a former meano who used to be called Nasty Paw. He was abducted by aliens and was reprogrammed into a good guy. He has since traveled with the aliens and often returns to Earth.

Episodes list
 "The Big Spill" – While the Paw Paw bears take care of an injured duckling, the wicked Dark Paw and his Meanos cause a flood to steal the Princess's mystic moonstone.
 "The Wishing Star Crystal" – When Princess Paw Paw is put into an eternal sleep by a magic flower, courtesy of Dark Paw, her friends must take a perilous journey to find a magic crystal to awaken her.
 "The Flying Horse Napper" – Dark Paw steals the Princess's magic whistle that allows her to summon Flying Cloud, and plans to use the flying horse to get a potion from his Aunt Pruney on Shriek Peak.
 "The Creepy Cave Creature" – After preventing the Paw Paws from calling Totem Bear, Dark Paw puts a large creature under his control to attack their village.
 "The Greedie Greenies" – When green blobs descend on the village and eat everything in sight, the Paw Paws must come to the rescue of their worst enemy, Dark Paw.
 "The Rise of the Evil Spirits" – When ancient spirits of evil awaken after 200 years to cause trouble for the Paw Paws, Dark Paw tries to gain control of them and finally take over the village.
 "The Genie-athalon" – When Eugene the Genie's lamp is uncovered and everyone tries to claim it, the Paw Paws compete against the cheating Dark Paw to win his three wishes.
 "The Golden Falcon" – When the Great Totem disappears and a mysterious golden falcon statue appears, Dark Paw takes the opportunity to challenge Brave Paw to a fight.
 "Honey of a Robbery" – It's Wise Paw's 100th birthday, and Dark Paw plans on ruining the celebration by stealing the village's entire honey supply. 
 "Tot 'em Termi' Nation" – Dark Paw brings the Black Stallion to lure away Flying Cloud and keep the Princess busy, so an army of termites can reduce the Great Totem to sawdust.
 "Waif Goodbye to the Paw Paws" – Dark Paw's Aunt Pruney helps him to take over the Paw Paw's village by disguising herself as a young and pretty Paw Paw.
 "The Dark Totem Pole Monster" – Dark Paw sets his sights on the moonstone around the neck of Totem Bear by building a giant mechanical version of himself, while Trembly Paw tries to help a young flying horse with a fear of flying.
 "Dark Paw Under Wraps" – When a flood uncovers the casket of a Paw Paw mummy, Dark Paw takes advantage of an ancient curse to take over as leader.
 "Genie Without a Lamp"
 "Egging Dark Paw On"
 "Two Heads Are Better than One"
 "The Great Paw Paw Turnaround"
 "The Lost Lake Monster"
 "Totem Time Trip"
 "S'no Business"
 "The Zip Zap 4-D Trap"

Merchandising
A line of Paw Paws toys were produced by Applause in 1985. Princess Paw Paw, Brave Paw, Mighty Paw, Pupooch, Medicine Paw, the Meanos and other characters were produced as PVC figurines ranging from 2" to 3" tall. The figurines had accessories, like a canoe or a cart. Pupooch was also produced as a plush toy. These were only produced for a short time and are rare today.

Cast
 Susan Blu – Princess Paw Paw
 Ruth Buzzi – Aunt Pruney
 Scatman Crothers – Eugene the Genie
 Leo De Lyon –
 Jerry Dexter - Medicine Paw
 Laurie Faso -
 Pat Fraley -
 Billie Hayes -
 John Ingle – Wise Paw
 Tom Kratochvil -
 Mitzi McCall -
 Don Messick – PaPooch, additional voices
 Howard Morris – Trembly Paw
 Rob Paulsen -
 Thom Pinto – Brave Paw
 Robert Ridgely – Mighty Paw
 Nielson Ross -
 Stanley Ralph Ross – Dark Paw
 Marilyn Schreffler -
 Alexandra Stoddart - Laughing Paw
 Frank Welker – Bumble Paw, Totem Bear, additional voices

Reception
One of many children's animated series of the 1980s, Paw Paws didn't leave a lasting impression on many viewers. In 2014, listing it among twelve 1980s cartoons that did not deserve remembrance, io9 characterized it as "Obviously, Hanna-Barbera was wrong. And kind of racist."

Home media
On April 9, 2019, Warner Archive released Paw Paws: The Complete Series on DVD in region 1 as part of their Hanna-Barbera Classics Collection.

References

External links
 

1985 American television series debuts
1986 American television series endings
1980s American animated television series
American children's animated adventure television series
American children's animated fantasy television series
Television shows about Native Americans
Animated television series about bears
English-language television shows
First-run syndicated television programs in the United States
The Funtastic World of Hanna-Barbera
Television series by Hanna-Barbera